Erioptera flavata is a species of crane fly in the family Limoniidae. It is found in damp forest.

Distribution
E. flavata is found in most parts of Europe, including the Faroe Islands.

References

Limoniidae
Diptera of Europe
Insects described in 1882